Jack Vinall (26 December 1920 – 17 November 1991) was an Australian rules footballer who played with Essendon in the Victorian Football League (VFL).

He originally came from Trafalgar in Gippsland to Queenscliff then to Williamstown District and Williamstown Juniors before playing with Essendon in 1944. Vinall then transferred to Williamstown in the VFA in 1945 and played 11 senior games up until the end of 1946. He then became captain-coach of the Seconds at Williamstown in 1947, coaching them to the premiership in 1948 and then retiring but continuing to coach the Seconds in 1949. He later coached the Thirds at Williamstown in 1953 and was President of the Thirds in 1965.

Notes

External links 		
		
		
		
		
		

1920 births
1991 deaths
Australian rules footballers from Victoria (Australia)
Essendon Football Club players